Macrochoriolaus elegans is a species of beetle in the family Cerambycidae, the only species in the genus Macrochoriolaus.

References

Lepturinae